Cicindela tranquebarica, the oblique-lined tiger beetle, is a species of flashy tiger beetle in the family Carabidae. It is found in North America.

Subspecies
These 11 subspecies belong to the species Cicindela tranquebarica:
 Cicindela tranquebarica arida A. C. Davis, 1928 (oblique-lined tiger beetle)
 Cicindela tranquebarica cibecuei Duncan, 1958
 Cicindela tranquebarica diffracta Casey, 1909 (diffracted tiger beetle)
 Cicindela tranquebarica inyo Fall, 1917 (oblique-lined tiger beetle)
 Cicindela tranquebarica joaquinensis Knisley & Haines, 2007 (Joaquin tiger beetle)
 Cicindela tranquebarica kirbyi LeConte, 1867 (oblique-lined tiger beetle)
 Cicindela tranquebarica parallelonota Casey, 1914 (oblique-lined tiger beetle)
 Cicindela tranquebarica sierra Leng, 1902 (sierra tiger beetle)
 Cicindela tranquebarica tranquebarica Herbst, 1806 (oblique-lined tiger beetle)
 Cicindela tranquebarica vibex G. Horn, 1867 (wealed tiger beetle)
 Cicindela tranquebarica viridissima Fall, 1910 (greenest tiger beetle)

References

Further reading

External links

 

tranquebarica
Articles created by Qbugbot
Beetles described in 1806